Vermont Secondary College is a state high school located in the eastern Melbourne suburb of Vermont, Victoria, Australia.

Vermont Secondary College opened as Vermont High School in 1962. The school buildings were constructed in stages between 1962 and 1970 using the Light Timber Construction (LTC) design of the Victorian Public Works Department. At completion, two classroom wings (designated "N" and "C" and a technical wing (designated "S") were constructed. In later years, a gymnasium/canteen complex was constructed, being partially funded by the former City of Nunawading as well as a football/cricket oval and soccer field. The school changed its name to Vermont Secondary College in 1991.

Vermont Secondary College school provides education for years 7–12 in the VCE system.

The school has recently undergone significant renovations with 2 of the 3 LTC wings undergoing significant remodelling and partial demolition and a 4th wing consisting of 12 portable class rooms being added. The grounds have also been improved with a fenced artificial surface soccer pitch being added as well as new set of asphalt netball/basketball courts with line markings for tennis also.

In 2010 the school structure was also significantly altered with a house system of 3 houses introduced. The houses are Hotham (Blue house), Macedon (Green  house) & Stirling (Red house). The 3 Houses are  all of which named after mountains to go with the school's previous tradition. Each house has a male and female house captain from year 12. There are also now two school captains, a male and a female chosen from year 12.

The school has a strong reputation for both academic success and sporting success with many sports teams making state finals. The school also has a strong music program although it has suffered significant downsizing as a result of funding redistribution in recent years.

Notable alumni
Gillian Armstrong - Director
Jocelyn Moorhouse - Writer/Director

External links
 Official website
 VHS / VSC Past Students Association

Public high schools in Melbourne
Educational institutions established in 1962
1962 establishments in Australia
School buildings completed in 1970
Buildings and structures in the City of Whitehorse